Crandon Lakes is an unincorporated community and census-designated place (CDP) split between Hampton Township and Stillwater Township, in Sussex County, New Jersey, United States. As of the 2010 United States Census, the CDP's population was 1,178, of which 682 were in Hampton Township and 496 in Stillwater Township.

Geography
According to the United States Census Bureau, the CDP had a total area of 2.675 square miles (6.928 km2), including 2.553 square miles (6.611 km2) of land and 0.122 square miles (0.317 km2) of water (4.57%).

Demographics

Census 2010

Census 2000
As of the 2000 United States Census there were 1,180 people, 405 households, and 326 families living in the CDP. The population density was 180.1/km2 (466.1/mi2). There were 492 housing units at an average density of 75.1/km2 (194.4/mi2). The racial makeup of the CDP was 97.71% White, 0.34% African American, 0.34% Native American, 0.51% Asian, 0.08% from other races, and 1.02% from two or more races. Hispanic or Latino of any race were 1.19% of the population.

There were 405 households, out of which 45.9% had children under the age of 18 living with them, 66.2% were married couples living together, 10.4% had a female householder with no husband present, and 19.5% were non-families. 15.1% of all households were made up of individuals, and 6.7% had someone living alone who was 65 years of age or older. The average household size was 2.91 and the average family size was 3.26.

In the CDP the population was spread out, with 29.5% under the age of 18, 6.5% from 18 to 24, 33.1% from 25 to 44, 23.1% from 45 to 64, and 7.8% who were 65 years of age or older. The median age was 36 years. For every 100 females, there were 96.0 males. For every 100 females age 18 and over, there were 93.0 males.

The median income for a household in the CDP was $56,188, and the median income for a family was $60,114. Males had a median income of $50,281 versus $36,429 for females. The per capita income for the CDP was $22,642. About 0.9% of families and 1.5% of the population were below the poverty line, including 1.2% of those under age 18 and none of those age 65 or over.

References

Census-designated places in Sussex County, New Jersey
Hampton Township, New Jersey
Stillwater Township, New Jersey